Mahadeo Prasad  is an Indian politician. He was elected to the Lok Sabha, the lower house of the Parliament of India from the Bansgaon constituency of Uttar Pradesh as a member of the Indian National Congress.

References

External links
 Official biographical sketch in Parliament of India website

1901 births
Year of death missing
Indian National Congress politicians
Lok Sabha members from Uttar Pradesh
India MPs 1957–1962
India MPs 1962–1967